Huston–Tillotson University (HT) is a private historically black university in Austin, Texas. Established in 1875, Huston–Tillotson University was the first institution of higher learning in Austin. The university is affiliated with the United Methodist Church, the United Church of Christ, and the United Negro College Fund. Huston–Tillotson University awards bachelor's degrees in business, education, the humanities, natural sciences, social sciences, science, and technology and a master's degree in educational leadership. The university also offers alternative teacher certification and academic programs for undergraduates interested in pursuing post-graduate degrees in law and medicine.

History

The history of Huston - Tillotson University lies in two schools: Tillotson College and Samuel Huston College.

Tillotson Collegiate and Normal Institute was chartered as a coeducational school in 1877 by the American Missionary Society of Congregational churches and its namesake, George Jeffrey Tillotson. It opened on January 17, 1881, and had 12 presidents: "William E. Brooks, first president (1881-85), was succeeded by John Hershaw (1886), Henry L. Lubbell (1886-1889), William M. Brown (1889-93), Winfield S. Goss (1894-95), Marshall R. Gaines (1896-1904), Arthur W. Partch (1905-06), Isaac M. Agard (1907-18), and Francis W. Fletcher (1919-23). J. T. Hodges, the first African American to be president (1924-29), was followed by Mary E. Branch (1930-44) and William H. Jones, who became president in 1944." Tillotson College was a women's college from 1926 to 1935.

Samuel Huston College developed out of an 1876 Methodist Episcopal conference. An 1883 agreement with the Freedmen's Aid Society led to the development of the college. The college was named after Samuel Huston of Marengo, Iowa, and the college opened in 1900.

On October 24, 1952, Tillotson College and Samuel Huston College merged to form Huston–Tillotson College. It then became Huston–Tillotson University on February 28, 2005.

Before the merger, future baseball legend Jackie Robinson accepted an offer from his old friend and pastor Rev. Karl Downs  who was president of the college, to be the athletic director at Samuel Huston College, then of the Southwestern Athletic Conference (SWAC).

Before joining the Kansas City Monarchs, Robinson coached the school's basketball team for the 1944–45 season. As a fledgling program, few students tried out for the basketball team, and Robinson even resorted to inserting himself into the lineup for exhibition games. Although his teams were outmatched by opponents, Robinson was respected as a disciplinarian coach, and drew the admiration of, among others, Langston University basketball player Marques Haynes, a future member of the Harlem Globetrotters.

Academics
HTU offers undergraduate and graduate degrees through the following:
College of Arts and Sciences
School of Business and Technology

The W.E.B. Dubois Honors Program is a selective program that provides highly qualified undergraduate students special academic and extracurricular opportunities.

HTU has an engineering dual degree program with Prairie View A&M University.  Under this program, HTU undergraduates complete preliminary required courses on campus and then automatically transfer to Prairie View A&M to complete their engineering degree.  Students who successfully complete the program will receive two degrees: a Bachelor of Science in mathematics from HTU and a Bachelor of Science in an engineering discipline from Prairie View A&M.

Campus

Huston–Tillotson University's campus is located at the site of the former Tillotson College on a land feature formerly known to local residents as Bluebonnet Hill. The  campus is located in East Austin, between seventh and 11th streets near I-35 and downtown Austin.  East Austin has historically been the city's designated place for African-American culture and empowerment largely due to Jim Crow segregation laws.

Most of the buildings on campus follow the same nomenclature as the name of the university, with hyphens denoting the importance of the contributions of individuals from both colleges before the merger.

Anthony and Louise Viaer Alumni Hall
The Anthony and Louise Viaer Alumni Hall (formerly known as the Old Administration Building) is listed on the National Register of Historic Places.

HT Student Body
In fall 2015, the student body was 57% female and 43% male.  68% identified as Black, 22% identified as Hispanic, 6% identified as Non-Hispanic White, and the remaining 4% identified with other ethnicity or racial groups.

Athletics
The Huston–Tillotson athletic teams are called the Rams. The university is a member of the National Association of Intercollegiate Athletics (NAIA), primarily competing in the Red River Athletic Conference (RRAC) since the 1998–99 academic year. The Rams previously competed as a founding member of the Southwestern Athletic Conference (SWAC) from 1920 to 1921 to 1953–54 (when it was majority known as Samuel Huston College), which is currently an NCAA Division I FCS athletic conference.

Huston–Tillotson competes in 12 intercollegiate varsity sports: Men's sports include baseball, basketball, cross country, soccer and track & field; while women's sports include basketball, soccer, softball, track & field and volleyball; and co-ed sports include cheerleading and eSports.

Facilities
The baseball team plays at historic Downs Field at East 12th Street and Alexander Avenue.

Notable people

Faculty
Mary Elizabeth Branch (1881-1944), president

Alumni
Dr. Herman A. Barnett III, First African-American to be admitted to the University of Texas Medical School and first native Texan African-American to graduate from a Texas medical school and to be licensed to practice medicine in Texas. He was a successful doctor.
Maceo T. Bowie, First president of the Kennedy-King City College in Chicago, IL.
Bobby Bradford, Jazz trumpeter, cornetist, bandleader, and composer.
Dr June H. Brewer, former professor of English at Huston–Tillotson University for 35 years and former chairperson for the English Department at Hutson-Tillotson. In 1950, Dr. Brewer was among the first five African Americans admitted to the University of Texas after the landmark Sweatt v. Painter case opened the university to African American students.
Bert Collins, former president and CEO of the North Carolina Mutual Insurance Company. (One of the oldest and largest African-American financial institutions).
Juanita Craft, politician and civil rights activist.
Dr. Karl E. Downs - minister in the United Methodist Church, graduated from Sam Huston College (now Huston–Tillotson University), in 1933, was the school's former president and was the personal friend and pastor of Major League Baseball Hall of Famer Jackie Robinson.
 Maud A. B. Fuller, Baptist leader and educator 
Ron Givens, first African-American Republican member of the Texas House of Representatives since 1982; represented Lubbock County from 1985 to 1989; Realtor in Lubbock
James A. Harris, Scientist part of a team that discovered and identified elements 104 and 105 in 1969-1970 which are now part of the periodic table of chemical elements.
Robert E. Hayes, bishop of the United Methodist Church and served as regional minister of congregations and ministries in Texas and Oklahoma.
Dr. Zan Wesley Holmes- retired pastor of the St. Luke 'Community' United Methodist Church in Dallas, Texas. A city icon and world recognized preacher, Pastor Holmes also has a middle school in Dallas that bears his name for his political and cultural contributions to African-Americans in Dallas.
Joe Leonard Jr., Assistant Secretary for Civil Rights, United States Department of Agriculture. Former executive director of the Congressional Black Caucus (CBC).
Azie Taylor Morton, Treasurer of the United States during the Carter administration.
Anthony "Tony" Norris, professional wrestler better known by his ring name Ahmed Johnson.
Volma Overton, Activist in the Civil Rights Movement
Robert G. Stanton, Former National Director of the U.S. Park Service during the Clinton administration 
Cecil Williams, Former minister of Glide Memorial United Methodist Church in San Francisco, as well as community leader, author, lecturer, and spokesperson for the poor.
Joyce Yerwood, physician and social justice advocate. First female African American physician in Fairfield County, Connecticut.

References

Further reading

External links

 
 
 Official athletics website

 
American Missionary Association
Universities and colleges affiliated with the United Church of Christ
Red River Athletic Conference
Former women's universities and colleges in the United States
Universities and colleges accredited by the Southern Association of Colleges and Schools
Universities and colleges in Austin, Texas
1881 establishments in Texas
Educational institutions established in 1881
Private universities and colleges in Texas
Historically black universities and colleges in Texas
Historically black universities and colleges in the United States